Henry Grady may refer to:

 Henry F. Grady (1882–1957), United States ambassador to India, Greece and Iran
 Henry W. Grady (1850–1889), American journalist and orator
 Henry Deane Grady (1764–1847), member of parliament for Limerick